Philip Thaxton Gressman (born November 22, 1978) is an American mathematician at The University of Pennsylvania, working primarily in the field of harmonic analysis.

Gressman grew up in Ava, Missouri, where he graduated from Ava High School in 1997. He double majored in Mathematics and Physics at Washington University in St. Louis in 2001. His undergraduate advisors were Guido Weiss and Edward N. Wilson. Gressman completed his Ph.D. in mathematics at Princeton University in 2005 under the guidance of Elias Stein. He was J. W. Gibbs Assistant Professor at Yale University before earning his permanent position at the University of Pennsylvania.

Together with Robert M. Strain, Gressman solved the full Boltzmann equation, which mathematically models the behavior of a dilute gas. More specifically, they proved global existence of classical solutions and rapid time decay to equilibrium for the Boltzmann equation with long-range interactions.

His work on the Boltzmann equation helped him be selected to represent the American Mathematical Society at the 19th Annual Coalition for National Science Funding (CNSF) Capitol Hill Exhibition in May 2013, where he discussed the importance of national science funding for pure and applied mathematics.

References

1978 births
Living people
21st-century American mathematicians
Washington University in St. Louis alumni
Washington University physicists
Mathematicians from Missouri
Washington University in St. Louis mathematicians
Princeton University alumni
People from Ava, Missouri
Scientists from Missouri
Physicists from Missouri
Yale University faculty
University of Pennsylvania faculty
Mathematicians at the University of Pennsylvania